Gaye Lynn Porteous (born June 26, 1965 in Calgary, Alberta) is a former field hockey player from Canada, who represented her native country at the 1992 Summer Olympics in Barcelona, Spain. There she ended up in seventh place with the Canadian National Women's Team.

External links
 
 

1965 births
Living people
Canadian female field hockey players
Female field hockey goalkeepers
Olympic field hockey players of Canada
Field hockey players at the 1992 Summer Olympics
Pan American Games medalists in field hockey
Pan American Games silver medalists for Canada
Field hockey players at the 1991 Pan American Games
Sportspeople from Calgary
Medalists at the 1991 Pan American Games